The European Universities Games (EUG) is an international multi-sport event, organized every two years for university athletes by the European University Sports Association (EUSA). The first edition was held in 2012 in Cordoba, Spain.
On April 9, 2016 the EUSA General Assembly in Wrocław, Poland announced Belgrade, Serbia to host the 2020 Edition.

Editions

Sport events

  Rugby

See also
 European Universities Championships

References

External links 
 

 
Student sports competitions
Multi-sport events in Europe